Michael D. Stifelman, M.D. (born May 7, 1967), an internationally recognized American physician and urologist, is known for his work in upper tract urinary reconstructive surgery and use of multi- and single-port robotic surgical technology to perform complex cancer and non-cancer urological procedures. An innovator in the field of urological surgery, Dr. Stifelman leads a renowned Center of Excellence for robotic surgery at Hackensack University Medical Center in Hackensack, New Jersey, and serves as chair of the hospital’s Department of Urology.

Biography
Dr. Stifelman has performed more than 3,000 robotic procedures and has pioneered more than a dozen minimally invasive surgical procedures. He has performed more robotic partial nephrectomies and upper urinary tract reconstructions than any surgeon in the New York metropolitan area. He is also one of the top 5 urologists in New Jersey for performing robotic prostate removal (prostatectomy).

In November 2018, Hackensack University Medical Center was among the first hospitals in the world — and the first hospital in New Jersey, and one of only 10 in the U.S. — to acquire the da Vinci SP® single-port system to perform complex urological procedures. Under Dr. Stifelman’s leadership, the team has performed more than 280 single port urological surgeries in 2019-2020 — one of the largest single port surgical series in the world.

In total, Dr. Stifelman’s team at Hackensack University Medical Center has performed more than 8,500 robotic surgical procedures, placing the group in the upper echelon of the field.

Dr. Stifelman has played a key role in developing and directing a robotic simulation skills lab, as well as designing and launching near-infrared fluorescence imaging for renal surgery, drop-in technology to enhance surgeon autonomy, tissue grafting for ureteral reconstruction, and the use of interoperative 3D virtual imaging. Each year, Dr. Stifelman travels nationally and internationally to teach advanced robotic surgical techniques to improve outcomes for patients around the world.

Additionally, Dr. Stifelman currently serves as Professor and Chairman of Urology at the Hackensack Meridian School of Medicine. Committed to the education and mentoring of the next generation of medical professionals, Dr. Stifelman has led the Department of Urology’s education efforts, offering best-in-class educational opportunities for residents and medical students.

Dr. Stifelman has been an invited lecturer and guest surgeon in 18 countries across six continents. He also collaborates with physicians at other institutions to pursue research initiatives aimed at improving best practices in robotic-assisted surgery. His research focuses on developing and evaluating new technology and applying it in the operating room. He has published 239 peer-reviewed articles and abstracts, 25 invited reviews/book chapters and 35 surgical technique videos that have been distributed by the American Urologic Association, European Urology and World Congress of Endourology.

Education

Dr. Stifelman earned his undergraduate degree in zoology from the University of Massachusetts and his medical degree from the Albert Einstein College of Medicine in the Bronx, NY. He completed his internship and residency in general surgery, as well as his urology residency at Columbia Presbyterian Medical Center, NY, serving as chief resident in urology during his final year. He received his fellowship in endourology and laparoscopy at New York-Presbyterian Weill Cornell, New York, NY, and is board certified in urology.

Career

Dr. Stifelman currently serves as Professor and Chairman of Urology, Hackensack Meridian School of Medicine; Chairman of Urology, Hackensack Meridian Hackensack University Medical Center; Director of Urologic Oncology at John Theurer Cancer Center; and Director of Robotic Surgery, Hackensack Meridian Health.

Dr. Stifelman joined Hackensack University Medical Center in 2016 from NYU Langone Medical Center in New York, NY, where he served in the following roles: professor of Urology, NYU School of Medicine; director of the Robotic Surgery Center, NYU Langone Medical Center; and chief of Urology Services, Tisch Hospital.
Medical Achievements

Research Interests

Dr. Stifelman’s current translational research interests include prostasomes for prostate cancer detection, creating a biorepository of urologic cancers, and amniotic membrane nerve regeneration.

Clinical research interests include the evaluation of minimally invasive surgical procedures — specifically robotic reconstruction of the urinary tract and robotic partial nephrectomy — to replace open surgical treatments; developing and standardizing teaching of advanced robotic techniques for residents and practicing surgeons; using near-infrared fluorescence imaging in robotic surgical procedures to improve tissue healing and minimize trauma to surrounding tissues; evaluation of buccal mucosa for ureteral substation and augmentation; and effects of intra-abdominal pressures during laparoscopic surgery on intraoperative and postoperative outcomes.

Clinical Trials

 Co-Investigator: A Randomized, Double-Blind, Placebo-Controlled, Parallel-Group, Multicenter Study of the Safety and Efficacy of Avanafil in the Treatment of Erectile Dysfunction Following Bilateral Nerve-Sparing Radical Prostatectomy. Sponsor: Vivus, 2009 - 2012. 2.	Co-Investigator. EDRN PCA3 Validation Trial and Urinary Reference Set, Sponsor: NIH/Gen-probe, 2009-2012.
 Co-Investigator: S12-03826: An International Phase 3 Randomized Trial of Autologous Dendritic Cell Immunotherapy (AGS-003) Plus Standard Treatment of Advanced Renal Cell Carcinoma (ADAPT). 2015
 Principal Investigator: Pro2016-0416: SurgiQuesT AirSeal in Robotic Partial Nephrectomy – TARPAN STUDY.  2016–present.
 Principal Investigator – NCT03694483 Prostasomes as Diagnostic Tool for Prostate Cancer Detection.  2018 – Present.

Patents

 Ureteral Tissue Expansion Catheter; United States Patent 63648
 Ureteral Stent and Retrieval Means, US Provisional Application 62/803, 179

Honors and awards
Awards and honors include:

 1989 – Cum Laude University of Massachusetts
 1989 – Louis Berman Research Scholarship
 1993 – Alfred A. Angrist Prize for Excellence in Pathology Research
 1997 – Columbia Presbyterian Medical Center House Staff Affairs Award
 2000 – US Surgical New York Presbyterian Laparoscopic Fellow
 2011 – Intuitive Crystal Award	
 2019 – Best Poster Award, World Congress of Endourology Annual Meeting (Abu Dhabi, UAE) “Operative and functional outcomes for selective clamping in robotic partial nephrectomy for patients with a solitary kidney.”

Memberships
International, National and Regional Committees/ Workshops

Hackensack University Medical Center Committees

Professional Society Memberships

Editorial Positions

Boards and Community Organizations 

 Advisory Board, Hospitality Fund, New York, NY
 Advisory Board, Health Concepts Partners, Saratoga, New York
 Scientific Advisory Board, Surgiquest, New Haven, CT
 Advisory Board, Vascular Technology Inc
 Scientific Board, Institute of Surgical Excellence
 Board Member, Hackensack Meridian Health System
 Scientific Advisory Board, Conmed, Denver, CO

Selected Works and Publications

Original Reports 

 Lee M, Lee Z, Strauss D, Jun MS, Koster H, Asghar AM, Lee R, Chao B, Cheng N, Ahmed M, Lovallo G, Munver R, Zhao LC, Stifelman MD, Eun DD. Multi-Institutional Experience Comparing Outcomes of Adult Patients Undergoing Secondary Versus Primary Robotic Pyeloplasty.  Urology. 2020 Jul 17:S0090-4295(20)30850-5. doi: 10.1016/j.urology.2020.07.008. []
 Badani KK, Kothari PD, Okhawere KE, Eun D. Hemal A, Abaza R, Porter J, Lovallo G, Ahmed M, Munver R, Stifelman MD.  Selective clamping during robot-assisted partial nephrectomy in patients with a solitary kidney: Is it safe and does it help? BJU Int., Mar 2020; 10.111/bju.15043; (Epub ahead of print).
 Billah MS, Stifelman M, Lovallo G, Ahmed M, Tsui JF, He W, Munver R.  Single port robotic assisted reconstructive urologic surgery – with the da Vinci SP surgical system. Trans Androl Urol. 2020 Apr 9;(2):870-878. doi: 10.21037/tau-2020.01.06. []
 Jun MS, Stair S, Xu A, Lee Z, Asghar AM, Strauss D, Stifelman MD, Eun DD, Zhao LC.  Collaborative of Reconstructive Robotic Ureteral Surgery (CORRUS). Urology. 2020 Jul 15:S0090-4295(20)30829-3. doi: 10.1016/j.urology.2020.06.062. Online ahead of print. []
 Beksac AT, Okhawere KE, Meilika K, Ige OA, Lee JY, Lovallo G, Ahmed M, Stifelman MD, Eun DD, Abaza R, Badani KK. Should a drain be routinely required after transperitoneal robotic partial nephrectomy? J Endourol. 2020 Jun 27. doi: 10.1089/end.2020.0325. Online ahead of print. []
 White C, Stifelman MD. Ureteral Reimplantation, Psoas Hitch, and Boari Flap. J Endourol. 2020 May; 34(S1):S25-S30. doi: 10.1089/end.2018.0750. []
 Beksac AT, Okhawere KE, Rosen DC, Elbakry A, Dayal BD, Daza J, Sfakianos JP, Ronney A, Eun DD, Bhandari A, Hemal AK, Porter J, Stifelman MD, Badani KK. Do patients with Stage 3-5 chronic kidney disease benefit from ischaemia-sparing techniques during partial nephrectomy? BJU Int. 2020 Mar;125(3):442-448. doi: 10.1111/bju.14956. Epub 2019 Dec 26. []
 Zhao LC, Weinberg AC, Lee Z, Ferretti MJ, Koo HP, Metro MJ, Eun DD, Stifelman MD. Robot assisted ureteral reconstruction using buccal mucosa grafts; A multi-institutional experience.  Eur Urol, Nov 2017; (Epub ahead of print).
 Marien T, Bjurlin MA, Wynia B, Bilbily M, Rao G, Zhao LC, Shah O, Stifelman MD. Outcomes of robotic-assisted laparoscopic upper urinary tract reconstruction: 250 consecutive patients. BJU Int. Oct 2015; 116(4):604-11.
 Bjurlin MA, Gan M, McClintock TR, Volpe A, Borofsky MS, Mottrie A, Stifelman MD. Near-infrared fluorescence imaging: Emerging applications in robotic upper urinary tract surgery. Eur Urol. Apr 2014; 65(4):793-801.
 Borofsky M, Stifelman MD. Near-infrared fluorescence imaging in robotic partial nephrectomy. In Robotic Renal Surgery: Benign and Cancer Surgery for the Kidneys and Ureters (pp. 89-96). Springer US, 2013.
 Hyams ES, Stifelman MD. Robotic Ureteral Reconstruction. Essentials Robotic Surgery. Li Ming Su (Ed), Elsevier. 203-240, New York 2011.
 Benway BM, Bhayani SB, Rogers CG, Dulabon LM, Patel MN, Lipkin M, Wang AJ, Stifelman MD. Robot assisted partial nephrectomy versus laparoscopic partial nephrectomy for renal tumors: a multi-institutional analysis of perioperative outcomes. J Urol. Sep 2009; 182(3):866-72.

Book Chapters 
Sivarajan G, Munver R: Laparoscopic, Laparoendoscopic Single-Site, and Robot-Assisted Living Donor Nephrectomy. In: Smith’s Textbook of Endourology, 4th Ed. Smith AD, Preminger GM, Kavoussi LR, et al (Eds.). Hoboken, United States: Wiley-Blackwell Publishing Ltd. Chapter 108, 2019

Books 
Techniques of Robotic Urinary Tract Reconstruction Stifelman, M. (Ed), Zhao, L. C. (Ed), Eun, D. D. (Ed), Koh, C. J. (Ed) (2021) This book provides a complete and thorough guide to the performance of robotic urinary tract reconstruction procedures, including the principals of successful reconstructive … Available Formats: Hardcover eBook

Abstracts 

 Stifelman MD, Desroches B, Deolankar J, Lovallo G, Munver R, Ahmed M.  Single Port vs. Multiport Robotic Surgery for the Upper Urinary Tract: Short Term Peri-Operative Outcome Analysis.  American Urological Association Annual Meeting, Online, 2020. 
 Lee Z, Asghar A, Strauss D, Lee R, Slawin J, Koster H, Jun M, Komaravolu S, Metro M, Stifelman MD, Zhao L, Eun D.  A Multi-Institutional Experience with Robotic Ureteroplasty with Buccal Mucosa Graft:  An Updated Analysis of Intermediate-Term Outcomes.  American Urological Association Annual Meeting, Online, 2020. 
 Lee Z, Ashgar A, Koster H, Lee R, Strauss D, Lee M, Komaravolu S, Kim D, Metro M, Stifelman MD, Eun D.  Ureteral Rest is Associated With Improved Outcomes in Patients Undergoing Robotic Ureteral Reconstruction of Proximal and Middle Ureteral Strictures.  American Urological Association Annual Meeting, Online, 2020. 
 Billah M, Ahmed M, Desroches B, Munver R, Lovallo G, Stifelman MD.  Single Port Robotic Pyeloplasty: Similar Outcomes, Excellent Cosmesis.  (Video) American Urological Association Annual Meeting, Online, 2020. 
 Stifelman MD, Bhayani S, Figenshau R, Porter J.  A Multi-Center, Prospective, Randomized, Controlled Study to Evaluate The Safety of a Valve-Less Trocar Insufflation System (AirSeal) vs. Conventional Insufflation for the Management of Pneumoperitoneum During Robotic Partial Nephrectomy.  American Urological Association Annual Meeting, Online, 2020.
 Billah M, Kim D, Youssef P, Kothari P, Deolankar, J, Komaravolu S, Stifelman MD: Single port robotic pyeloplasty: Similar outcomes, excellent cosmesis (Video). World Congress of Endourology 37th Annual Meeting, Abu Dhabi, United Arab Emirates, October 29-November 2, 2019.
 John Stites*, Benjamin Press, Helaine Koster, Tenzin Lama-Tamang, Greg Lovallo, Mutahar Ahmed, Ravi Munver, Stifelman MD. Hackensack Multi-Disciplinary Robotic-Assisted Laparoscopic Partial Nephrectomy (RPN) Pathway: Improving Quality Metrics. American urological Association Annual Meeting, San Francisco, CA, 2018.
 Ziho Lee, Aaron Weinberg, Mark Ferretti, Benjamin Waldorf, Eric Cho, Daniel Eun, Lee Zhao, Stifelman MD.  A Multi-institutional Experience with Robotic Ureteroplasty with Buccal Mucosa Graft. American Urological Association Annual Meeting, Boston, MA 2017.
 Marshall S*, Taneja SS, Huang WC, Stifelman MD. Retroperitoneal Partial Nephrectomy for Posterior Tumors: Is it Better Than the Transperitoneal Approach?. American Urological Association Annual Meeting, Orlando, FL., 2014.

For a complete list of publications, visit Michael Stifelman’s Google Scholar page.

Teaching videos in distribution

American Urologic Association 
 Robotic bladder diverticulectomy: The NYU technique
 Robotic assisted pyeloplasty reproducing the open approach.
 Robotic Ureterocalycostomy: The NYU technique
 Robotic sacrohysteropexy: The NYU technique
 Robotics in the management of mid ureteral obstruction.
 Robotic assisted re-implant and psoas hitch in the treatment of distal ureteral stricture.
 Laparoscopic pyeloplasty for secondary ureteropelvic junction obstruction.
 Robotic partial nephrectomy: The NYU technique
 Robotic ureteroureterostomy for the management of retrocaval ureter.
 Robotic partial nephroureterectomy for a duplicated collecting system and ectopic ureter.
 Robotic partial nephrectomy: Dealing with dilemmas.
 Robotic ureterolysis and omental wrap: Lessons learned from 24 cases.
 Rennoraphy during robotic partial nephrectomy: Progression of technique.
 Transmesenteric Robotic Pyeloplasty in a horse shoe kidney.
 Retroperitoneal robotic partial nephrectomy: A novel four arm approach.

World Congress of Endourology 
 Laparoscopic approaches to the renal hilum: Retroperitoneal, transperitoneal, and hand assisted.
  Pediatric laparoscopic partial nephrectomy: The NYU technique.
 Da Vinci assisted laparoscopic pyeloplasty.
 Da Vinci surgical system assisted laparoscopic partial nephrectomy.
 Robotic pyeloplasty reproducing the open approach.
 Robotic ureterolysis with omental wrap: The NYU technique.
 Robotic ureteroureterostomy for the management of retrocaval ureter.
  Robotic partial nephroureterectomy for a duplicated collecting system and ectopic ureter.
 Laparoscopic doppler technology: Applications in laparoscopic pyeloplasty, radical and partial nephrectomy.
 Retroperitoneal robotic partial nephrectomy: A novel four arm approach.
 Selective clamping using a novel fluorescence imaging technique.

External links 

 Dr. Michael Stifelman at Hackensack University Medical Center
 Hackensack University Medical Center Department of Urology
 Google Scholar: Michael Stifelman
 Experts in Surgery: Michael D. Stifelman, M.D.
 Twitter: @mdstifelman
 YouTube: Michael Stifelman

References

Hackensack
2. http://www.hackensackumc.org/-hackensack-university-medical-center-announces-dr-michael-d-stifelman-as-chairman-of-the-department-of-urology/
3. http://www.hackensackumc.org/our-services/surgical-services/urology/our-team/michael-stifelman/

Living people
American urologists
Albert Einstein College of Medicine alumni
1967 births